Colours of the Syrian hamster can be described in three ways: as "self", "agouti" or "combinations". Self colours are a consistent coat colour with the same colour topcoat and undercoat. Agouti hamsters have a different, lighter undercoat and markings around the eyes. Combinations are produced when two (or more) self or agouti colours are present.

Natural hamster mutations
Natural hamster mutations are those that crop up naturally; unlike combination mutations, these are mutations unto themselves and not expressed by mixing two genes.

Golden or wild type
Golden is the original colouration of Syrian hamsters. Originally classified as "Dark Golden" and "Light Golden", this description and standard has now fallen out of favour as a "Light Golden" is simply a golden that lacks defined black ticking. Despite being the original mutation, the number of Creams and Cinnamons tends to outweigh the number of Goldens, and finding a pure line of Goldens not carrying any other known mutation has become difficult.

Black

The black colour was imported to the UK in 1991. Before then, Sables were referred to as black, but are lighter than the actual black hamsters. Black hamsters have a consistent jet black coat, with some white on the paws and belly. The black gene is recessive, which is why the variation was not discovered until recently. The discovery of the black hamster has allowed scientists and breeders to produce many new variations, including Dove, when bred with Cinnamon hamsters, and Chocolate, when combined with rust. This colouration is often falsely known as "Black Bear" and, if with a Band or other White Pattern, "Panda Bear". Both of these terms are, however, incorrect.

Cream

The cream variety ranges from sandy to orange-cream. This variation (a naturally occurring mutation) was first discovered in the United Kingdom in 1951 and is a "self" colour. There are further sub-types of this variation, determined by the colour of the eyes, which can be black, red or ruby. Black eyed creams typically have dark grey ears, although this is not necessarily the case, whereas red eyed creams have flesh coloured ears.

Cinnamon 
Cinnamon is a recessive gene and is a very common one. It first appeared in 1958. Many owners confuse this colour with Golden, Honey and Yellow.

Another kind of Cinnamon is Cinnamon Fawn (ppruru), a very rare color thought to be extinct. Cinnamon Fawn appeared in the 1960s in the results sheets of the Midland Hamster club, in England. Unlike Cinnamon, Cinnamon Fawn is pastel orange, with a grey undercoat instead of a blueish one and has flesh coloured ears and not brown ones.

White

There are three different types of white hamster: dark, flesh eared and black eyed. All three are completely white. The dark eared variety first appeared in 1952 and has red eyes which darken as the animal ages. Black eyed whites have flesh coloured ears. Flesh eared whites, often described as albinos, were first mentioned in the National Hamster Council Journal in 1956. As the name suggests, flesh eared whites have flesh ears and pink eyes.

Rust 
Rust, formerly called Guinea Gold, is a naturally occurring mutation that is currently very rare. They are very easily mistaken for Goldens. The difference between a Rust and a Golden is mostly in the cheek flashes; in Rust they are Brown rather than Black, and the base colour for Rust is a brownish colour rather than a slate grey.

Dark Grey
Dark Grey is a recessive mutation. Due to the Dark Grey's genes, there is often a mutation known as "kinked tail". The genes for kinked tail are heavily linked to the Dark Grey gene.

Light Grey
This gene is currently extremely rare. Light Greys fell out of favour to the Silver Grey and Dark Grey genes due to the fact Light Grey was difficult to breed and a lot of Light Greys had aggression issues and smaller size. If two Light Greys were mated any pups which were "LgLg" would die in utero.

Silver Grey
Silver Grey is a highly dominant gene. It was discovered in Sweden and brought to the UK in 1991. Because it is highly dominant, not many hamsteries want to work with it. Silver Grey should never be bred to Dark Grey 
as it can make it difficult to tell which is which; likewise it should also never be bred to Polywhite or any mutations with the Black (aa) Gene.

Yellow
Yellow is a sex-linked mutation; this means that, depending on the sex, the gene code and the colours produced when mating will depend on which gender was the Yellow. The Yellow gene locus is on the X chromosome, one of the sex chromosomes. Female hamsters, like all female mammals, have two X chromosomes, while males have an X and a Y chromosome. Yellow is an incomplete dominant gene; a hamster needs to have at least one Yellow gene in order to be Yellow, but if another gene is expressed at the same time this causes both Yellow and the other colour to be expressed. This produces patches of Yellow and non Yellow fur, which is known as Tortoiseshell.  Since only female hamsters have two X chromosomes, (and hence two Yellow gene loci), only females can be tortoiseshell. Male hamsters are either Yellow or non Yellow.

Female Yellow hamsters must inherit Yellow from both parents and hence can only occur in litters where the male has the Yellow gene and the female is either Yellow or Tortoiseshell.

Combination mutations
These are mutations that occur when two or more genes are expressed at the same time.

Beige

Beige is a rare colour, because it is produced by breeding together a hamster with the rust and dark grey gene, which are, themselves, rare. The beige variety is often smaller than the rest of the litter and may have a kinked tail due to the Dark Grey gene.

Sable

When it was discovered in 1975, this variation was originally named black. Since the discovery of the melanistic black variety, it has been renamed to sable. The topcoat is black and the undercoat is ivory cream, with a black belly, black eyes and dark-grey ears. The fur around the eyes is also ivory cream. Sable comes from Umbrous bred to Cream.

Ivory
Ivory is a combination gene that is not often seen. It can come in both black eyed and red eyed varieties. Ivory can be created by using any of the three Greys.

Honey
Honey is a complex gene and as such is uncommon. Honey is made by combining the sex-linked Yellow gene and the recessive Cinnamon gene. Since females have two X chromosomes, (see notes on Yellow), they must inherit both Cinnamon and Yellow genes from both parents. Males must inherit Cinnamon from both parents and the Yellow gene from their mother (on their single X chromosome).

If a Male Yellow carrying Cinnamon is mated to a Female Cinnamon, the result will not be Honey, but Golden or Cinnamon males and Cinnamon Tortoiseshell or Golden Tortoiseshell females. However, when done as a Female Yellow carrying Cinnamon to a male Cinnamon, the result will still be Cinnamon Tortoiseshell and Golden Tortoiseshell females but the males will be Honey or Yellow. Honey females must inherit both Yellow and Cinnamon from both parents, e.g. when a Honey male, (or Yellow male carrying Cinnamon), is mated to a female who is Cinnamon Tortoiseshell, Golden Tortoiseshell carrying Cinnamon or Honey.

Lilac
Lilac is a rare combination mutation that is not usually actively bred for anymore. It was once commonplace on the show table and loved by many for its beautiful pink hue. However, due to overbreeding the Lilac is no longer as popular, as its pink hues quickly turn brown.

Blonde
Blonde is a rarely seen mutation. It is a creamy blonde with an orange tint.

Copper
Copper is one of the two hardest mutations to achieve and is thought to be impossible to achieve in North America. It is a striking Copper colour. Copper bred to copper will produce all copper, but the rarity of Copper makes finding a Copper pair nearly impossible. When trying to create copper from two individuals that carry all the genes needed there is a 1 in 85 chance of getting a Copper.

Blue Mink
Blue Mink is the other rarest and hardest mutation to find. It was found sometime after 1975.

Mink
Mink is an uncommon three combination colour. It is paler than Copper and Sable Chocolate.

Blue
Blue is made up of Black and the Dilute gene. It creates an animal that varies in shade from a deep blacky-blue to a very light powdery blue-grey.

Lavender
Lavender is made up from Black, Rust Gene and the Dilute gene. It creates a color similar to a purple all over the fur to the tips of the toes.

Eyeless white hamsters 
Eyeless white hamsters, genetically WhWh, occur when two hamsters are bred that carry the White Bellied gene (Wh). White bellied is a specific gene and should not be confused with hamsters which have white fur on their bellies, i.e. white banded hamsters (Baba or BaBa), dominant spotted hamsters, (Dsds) or recessive dapples (rdrd). Eyeless white hamsters are more correctly called Anophthalmic whites and can survive well in spite of this. Hamsters do not rely on their eyesight as much as other mammals. They live below ground during the day and are active at twilight and near dawn, so it does not affect them much. The hamster relies heavily on scent and the detection of vibrations, as well as sound to some extent. Despite the fact that hamsters can live easily with this mutation, it is a mutation that should never be produced.

Albino Syrian hamster 
A true albino Syrian hamster has yet to be discovered; the closest is a red-eyed white (sometimes called a flesh-eared white).

Eyes and ears
The colour of a hamster's eyes and ears is usually determined by the coat colour. Some coat colours have several different eye and ear colour combinations, however, such as the cream variety which can have black, red or ruby eyes. Sometimes hamsters can present heterochromia, sometimes known as "odd eyes".

Patterns

Banded 

First reported in 1957, a banded (BaBa, Baba, or Ba-) hamster will have a band of white around the middle. The width of the band will differ, from a small strip to most of the body. Most colours can exist banded.

Piebald
The first Piebald was reported in 1945. A Piebald is a coloured hamster that has white spots on its body. The spots can be few and small or can cover the hamster. Piebalds can also have coloured bellies. This pattern is hard to breed and is believed by some to be extinct.

Dominant spot 
The dominant spot (Dsds) variety was first discovered in the United States in 1964, and quickly became more popular than the Piebald variety due to it being easy to breed with less issues. The variety is described by UK and US standards as "a white animal with coloured spots".

Recessive Dappled 
Recessive Dappled is an uncommon gene. It looks very similar to Dominant Spot. One of the classic tell-tale signs of Recessive Dapple is a Blaze up the forehead; however this is not a reliable way to tell because Dominant Spot also commonly has a blaze up the forehead.

Roan 
The roan (Whwh) pattern in Syrians consists of a white animal ticked with colour. The ticking is heavy around the head and give an evenly marbled appearance over the remainder of the top coat. The white areas are white to the roots. The coloured areas conform to the recognised coloured variety allowing for slight dilution. If a roan is bred to another roan, a dominant spot, a banded, or a white bellied hamster, 25% of the litter will be eyeless whites.

Tortoiseshell 

A tortoiseshell (ToTo) is a bi-coloured animal that consists of a balanced pattern of coloured and yellow patches. These patches are clear and distinct with no brindling. Only females can be torties, as the pattern involves one copy of the sex-linked Yellow gene and one copy of the alternative non Yellow gene. Since female hamsters inherit a Yellow or non Yellow gene from each parent, whenever a Yellow and a non Yellow hamster are mated together, all the female offspring will be Tortoiseshell.

Tortoiseshell and White 
Tortoiseshell and White (ToToBaba, ToToBaBa, or ToToDsds) is like tortoiseshell but with a white band or patches. They must have a white belly, since they have a white patterning gene, either Banded or Dominant Spot. Only females can be tortie and white, as the pattern involves one copy of the sex linked Yellow gene and one copy of the alternative non Yellow gene.

Coat types

Shorthair (LL)
The first hamsters discovered were shorthairs. Shorthair hamsters simply have short hair.

Longhair (ll)

The longhair coat type is a hamster with hair that is up to 4 inches (10 cm). They are often referred to as "teddy bear hamsters" by pet stores due to their bear-like appearance and as a marketing tactic to sell them more easily.

Male Syrians usually have much longer hair than female Syrians. Hair is typically longer from the hips down, forming a 'skirt'.

Rex (rxrx) 

The Rex coat modifier first appeared in 1970. It is a recessive gene, characterised mainly by short, curly whiskers. It can appear in both shorthaired and longhaired hamsters. The curls are more visible on the shorthaired and displays as a wavy coat on the longhaired hamsters. Because of the variance in curliness, the most foolproof way of knowing if a hamster is Rex is by looking at the whiskers.

Satin (Sasa) 
These hamsters have smooth, shiny satin fur. Breeding two Satins together creates thin, greasy fur and is not recommended.

References

To avoid confusion, all genomes listed are those stated in Hamsterlopedia by Chris and Peter Logsdail, unless referenced otherwise. Some sources may use different sources.

Variations